3E or 3-E may refer to:

3e, general entertainment channel in Ireland
3rd meridian east
Third edition in the Editions of Dungeons & Dragons
NY 3E, alternate name for New York State Route 104
OK-3E, abbreviation for Oklahoma State Highway 3
3E, a model of Toyota E engine
3Ε (Tria Epsilon), an abbreviation for the Coca-Cola Hellenic Bottling Company

See also
E3 (disambiguation)
EEE (disambiguation)
Triple E (disambiguation)